Aparicio is both a surname and a given name. Notable people with the name include:  

Surname
 António Aparício (born 1958), Portuguese footballer
 Carlos Aparicio (born 1982), Bolivian politician
 Huáscar Aparicio (1972–2013), Bolivian singer
 José Aparicio (1773–1838), Spanish painter of the Neoclassic period
 Julio Aparicio Díaz (born 1969), Spanish bullfighter, known for getting gored through his mouth by a bull
 Luis Aparicio (born 1934), Venezuelan baseball player
 Manny Aparicio (born 1995), Canadian soccer player
 Nestor Aparicio (born 1968), American radio personality
 Rafaela Aparicio (1906–1996), Spanish film and theatre actress
 Severo Aparicio Quispe (1923–2013), Peruvian Roman Catholic bishop
 Sofia Aparício (born 1970), Portuguese model and actress
 Yalitza Aparicio (born 1993), Mexican actress

Given name
Aparicio Méndez (1904–1988), Uruguayan political leader
Aparicio Saravia (1856–1904), Uruguayan political leader

See also
4232 Aparicio, inner main-belt asteroid
Estadio Luis Aparicio El Grande, stadium in Maracaibo, Venezuela